Marinko Magda is a Serbian hitman who has murdered 11 people in Serbia and Hungary.

Murders in Serbia 
In 1994 he killed five people in the town of Subotica: Milan Petrić, Stana Petrić, Dane Petrić, Josip Agatić and Verica Agatić.

Murders in Hungary 
On January 13, 1994, in Szeged, Hungary, the 42-year-old Bálint Z. Nagy (a local confectioner), his 42-year-old wife, and their 16- and 10-year-old children were shot dead in their apartment. On January 28, 1994, the Hungarian police arrested Marinko Magda as the main suspect of murder of the Z. Nagy family. An investigation revealed that the same weapon which was used to kill the Nagy family was used to kill a Hungarian couple, Horváth Antal and his wife, as well as Dragutin Kujundžić (a Croatian), on December 20, 1993, in Kecskemét, Hungary.

Magda received a life sentence for killing three people in 1995. Given that before 1998, all life sentences were, at minimum, 25–30 years' imprisonment, he was expected to remain behind bars until at least the year 2020, unless he dies beforehand.

In 2005 he was fined 40,000 HUF for having attacked a prison guard 18 months before. If he fails to pay this fine his imprisonment will be extended by 200 days.

References

Family murders
Living people
Serbian mass murderers
Year of birth missing (living people)